Edward Francis Tamblyn (January 5, 1908 – June 22, 1957) was an American actor. He was the father of actor Russ Tamblyn and keyboardist Larry Tamblyn (The Standells), and the  grandfather of actress Amber Tamblyn.

Born in Yonkers, New York, the son of Edna (née Brown; 1883–1975) and Joseph Tamblyn (1878–1941), he became an actor in the 1930s and made uncredited roles in some movies.

Tamblyn died at the age of 49 in Hollywood, California on June 22, 1957.

Selected filmography
The Main Event (1938) (uncredited) – Program Seller
Mountain Music (1937) (uncredited) – Bellboy
Star for a Night (1936) (uncredited) – Messenger
Palm Springs (1936) (off screen credits) – Soda Clerk
Follow the Fleet (1936) (uncredited) – Sailor
In Old Kentucky (1935) (uncredited) – Jockey
It's in the Air (1935) (uncredited) – Jockey
Dante's Inferno (1935) (uncredited) – Page Boy
The Daring Young Man (1935) (uncredited) – Office Boy
A Shot in the Dark (1935) – Bill Smart
Mrs. Wiggs of the Cabbage Patch (1934) (as Edward Tamblyn) – Usher
 Money Means Nothing (1934) (as Edward Tamblyn) – Robert 'Robby' Ferris
Hollywood Party (1934) (uncredited) – Bob's Friend
Harold Teen (1934) – Shadow
I've Got Your Number (1934) (uncredited) – Messenger
Flying Down to Rio (1933) (uncredited) – Yankee Clipper
The Sweetheart of Sigma Chi (1933) – Harry

References

External links
 
 Vaudeville page of Eddie Tamblyn

1908 births
1957 deaths
People from Yonkers, New York
American male film actors
20th-century American male actors
Male actors from New York (state)